Drive Angry (alternatively titled Drive Angry 3D) is a 2011 American action horror film in the grindhouse cinema tradition, directed by Patrick Lussier, who co-wrote it with Todd Farmer. The film stars Nicolas Cage, Amber Heard, William Fichtner, Billy Burke, Charlotte Ross, Katy Mixon, and Tom Atkins. Photographed in 3D, the film was released on February 25.

Plot

John Milton escapes from Hell and steals Satan's gun, the Godkiller, in order to kill Jonah King, a Satanistic cult-leader who murdered Milton's daughter and her husband, and plans to ritually sacrifice Milton's infant granddaughter, believing that it will unleash Hell on Earth.

After interrogating and killing some of King's followers in Colorado, Milton discovers that the ritual will take place in Stillwater, an abandoned prison in Louisiana. On his way there, he stops by a diner, where he meets Piper Lee, a waitress. Milton abandons his damaged car and sabotages Piper's 1969 Dodge Charger, offering to fix it in exchange for a ride.

Piper walks in on her boyfriend, Frank, cheating on her. Piper beats the woman and tosses her out and assaults Frank, who knocks Piper unconscious. Milton hears the commotion and comes to Piper's aid. Milton "borrows" Frank's car, taking Piper with him to Stillwater. Satan's supernatural operative, The Accountant, arrives on Earth with the mission to retrieve Milton and the gun. The Accountant interrogates Frank and discovers Milton's destination. After killing Frank, he poses as an FBI agent, and tricks a pair of state troopers into helping him.

Stopping at a shady hotel, Milton is having sex with a waitress from a nearby bar when King and his men attack. Milton violently dispatches them with many rounds of gunfire, leaving the naked and terrified waitress completely traumatized. The Accountant appears with the police and chases Milton and Piper, who are now hotly pursuing King in his RV. Milton uses the Godkiller to shoot at the Accountant, causing him to drive off a bridge. They follow King to a former church, find it filled with King's Satan-worshipers, and they are ambushed and captured by the cult. They kidnap Piper and shoot Milton in the eye, leaving him for dead. He awakens, kills King's cult, and pursues the RV in the Charger. Piper breaks free, fights King, and jumps through the RV's shattered window onto Milton's car hood. King disables the Charger by shooting its engine.

Milton and Piper meet Milton's friend, Webster, who gives them a 1971 red Chevrolet Chevelle SS. Piper discovers that Milton is undead and had to abandon his daughter in order to protect her, which allowed King to manipulate her into joining his cult. Webster reveals that Milton died 10 years earlier in a shootout and was a pallbearer at Milton's funeral. Piper also discovers that the Godkiller has the power to completely destroy a soul, preventing it from going to either Heaven or Hell. Meanwhile, one of King's surviving men tells the Accountant why Milton is chasing them.

After arming himself, Milton tells Piper and Webster to leave, but Piper says that she has never before had a worthy cause to fight for and is with him regardless of the consequences. With the help of the now-intrigued Accountant, they evade a sheriff's troopers and arrive at Stillwater. The Accountant captures Piper and forces Milton to surrender the Godkiller before he can battle King. He allows Milton to attempt to save his granddaughter, however, noting that Satan despises the sacrifice of innocents in his name.

While Milton slaughters King's men before they can sacrifice his grandchild, Piper escapes from The Accountant with the Godkiller. King eventually gets the upper hand on Milton and savagely beats him. Piper fires the Godkiller at King, but misses, knocking herself out. King is enraged when another follower refuses to sacrifice the infant. The Accountant attracts King's attention, allowing Milton to grab the Godkiller and obliterate King forever.

The Accountant retrieves the infant and allows Milton to say goodbye to his granddaughter. Milton gives her to Piper, who promises to always care for her. Webster arrives and looks on as Milton "dies". After both Piper and Webster have left, Milton is revealed to not be fully dead. Milton makes good on his earlier promise to Webster and drinks a beer from the remains of King's skull. He agrees to return to Hell but threatens to escape again if his punishment remains too severe. The Accountant says that he looks forward to that escape. The Accountant then manifests a 1957 Chevrolet Bel Air and Milton drives them back into Hell.

Cast
 Nicolas Cage as John Milton. He returns from Hell after ten years to save his granddaughter. He steals Satan's personal gun, the Godkiller, to delay the Accountant. He does not mind the pain that he suffers in Hell, but finds being forced to watch the video feed of his daughter's murder to be intolerable.
 Amber Heard as Piper Lee. She is a waitress at a local bar and has a cheating fiancee whom she abandons to join with Milton to save his granddaughter.
 William Fichtner as The Accountant. He is Satan's somewhat arrogant assistant. He was assigned to return Milton back to Hell and notes that sometimes, he needs to return escaped souls. He possesses a coin, which he can use to kill or transform into an FBI badge to assist his impersonation.
 Billy Burke as Jonah King. He is a ruthless Satanist who believes that sacrificing Milton's granddaughter will bring Hell back to Earth and that he will be immortal. (The Accountant denies this, saying that Satan himself dislikes satanists.)
 David Morse as Webster
 Katy Mixon as Norma Jean
 Charlotte Ross as Candy
 Christa Campbell as Mona Elkins
 Pruitt Taylor Vince as Roy
 Todd Farmer as Frank Raimi
 Tom Atkins as Captain 
 Jack McGee as Lou 'Fat Lou'

Production
Cage stated that he was originally drawn to the project by a scene in which his character's eyes get shot out. In his previous film, Season of the Witch, he had wanted to have such a scene but producers rejected the idea.

The film was shot in 3D, and special effects were created by Gary Tunnicliffe. The cameras were rented from Paradise FX. One reason Cage chose this film was to be part of the new 3D technology.

The three cars driven by Cage in the film are a 1964 Buick Riviera, a 1969 Dodge Charger R/T (440 Engine) and a 1971 Chevrolet Chevelle SS 454. Writer/director Patrick Lussier said the Riviera, used at the beginning and the end, "was the car we wished we had used the most, because it was a beautiful driving car", but "It was a shame to smack it up". Three Chargers and three Chevelles were used, with one made very safe for the stunts, and one intended to be shown close to being destroyed.

Cage narrated the supernatural film at WonderCon 2010. Patrick Lussier wrote the film with Todd Farmer. Lussier filmed the movie in Minden, Plain Dealing and Shreveport, Louisiana.

Release

Box office
The film was released in the US on February 25, 2011. Footage premiered on July 23, 2010 as part of the San Diego Comic-Con International. It opened at ninth place within the box office rankings at $1.6 million on Friday, with a lower than expected $5 million weekend. Drive Angry box office performance made it the lowest-grossing opening of a 3D film released in more than 2,000 US theaters. The film was slightly more successful in international markets, earning $30.3 million.

Home media
Drive Angry was released on DVD, Blu-ray, and 3D Blu-ray on May 31, 2011.

Critical reception
On the review aggregator website Rotten Tomatoes, the film has an approval rating of 47% based on reviews from 123 critics, with an average rating of 5.4 out of 10. The website's "Critics Consensus" says: "It may deliver the over-the-top action pieces, but Drive Angry prefers to work safely within the grindhouse formula than do something truly unique". On Metacritic the film has a score of 44 out of 100, based on reviews from 21 critics, indicating "mixed or average reviews". Audiences polled by CinemaScore gave the film a grade of C+ on a scale from A to F.

Mark Jenkins from The Washington Post wrote, "Even at its most lurid, though, the movie is a little dull. And it only gets less compelling as the back story fills in". Roger Ebert of the Chicago Sun-Times gave the film 2 out of 4 and called it "an exercise in deliberate vulgarity, gross excess, and the pornography of violence, not to forget garden variety pornography. You get your money's worth". Elizabeth Weitzman from the New York Daily News wrote, "Drive Angry is pure grindhouse, so committed to its own junkiness that it is, in its way, a pleasure to behold". Writing for Variety, Rob Nelson called it "plenty watchable" but probably more of a draw to cult film fans than to mainstream audiences.  In The Hollywood Reporter, David Rooney called the film "a mindless exploitation entry that should have been appallingly awesome".

References

External links
 
 

2011 films
2010s fantasy action films
2010s road movies
2011 3D films
2010s action horror films
American chase films
American exploitation films
American action horror films
American dark fantasy films
American road movies
Films about automobiles
American films about revenge
Films about Satanism
Films directed by Patrick Lussier
Films produced by Michael De Luca
Films scored by Michael Wandmacher
Films set in Colorado
Films set in Louisiana
Films set in Oklahoma
Films shot in Louisiana
Summit Entertainment films
American vigilante films
Nu Image films
Saturn Films films
American supernatural horror films
Demons in film
Supernatural fantasy films
Films with screenplays by Todd Farmer
American splatter films
2010s English-language films
2010s American films